Love Song Best is the third compilation album from J-Pop/R&B singer Crystal Kay.  The album was announced by Kay's former longtime label Epic Records Japan after her move to Universal Music Japan sublabel Delicious Deli Records and its release was set to coincide with the release of Kay's first single with Delicious Deli, "Superman".

Track listing

Charts

Release history

References 

2011 compilation albums
Crystal Kay albums
Epic Records compilation albums